Michael Wayne Pearson (born August 22, 1980) is an American former college and professional football player who was an offensive tackle in the National Football League (NFL) and the Canadian Football League (CFL) for five seasons.  Pearson played college football for the University of Florida, and earned consensus All-American honors.  A second-round pick in the 2002 NFL Draft, he played professionally for the Jacksonville Jaguars of the NFL and the Toronto Argonauts of the CFL.

Early years 

Pearson was born in Tampa, Florida in 1980.  He attended Armwood High School in Seffner, Florida, where he played high school football for the Armwood Hawks.

College career 

Pearson accepted an athletic scholarship to attend the University of Florida in Gainesville, Florida, where he played for coach Steve Spurrier's Florida Gators football team from 1999 to 2001.  After being red-shirted in 1998, he was a three-year letterman for the Gators, and he received the Gators' James W. Kynes Award, recognizing him as the lineman who "best exemplified mental and physical toughness and iron-man determination."  He was also a two-time Southeastern Conference (SEC) Academic Honor Roll selection.  Pearson played in thirty-five games with thirty-three starts, including two bowl games: the 2001 Orange Bowl and the 2000 Sugar Bowl.  He was a first-team All-SEC selection in 2000 and 2001, and was recognized as a consensus first-team All-American in 2001.

Pearson graduated from the University of Florida with a bachelor's degree in business administration in 2001, and was inducted into the University of Florida Athletic Hall of Fame as a "Gator Great" in 2013.

Professional career 

Pearson was drafted in the second round (40th pick overall) in the 2002 NFL Draft by the Jacksonville Jaguars, and he played for the Jaguars from  through .  His "break" came in his rookie season, when offensive tackle Maurice Williams was injured.  Pearson started at left tackle for thirty-one consecutive games, until he was injured on October 3, 2004 against the Indianapolis Colts; after knee surgery he was placed on injured reserve, and returned in 2005.  He started two games in 2005, and was released.  In 2006, he was signed by the Miami Dolphins, but released during training camp.  He signed by the Houston Texans in November and was released in December.

In June , he signed as a free agent with the CFL's Toronto Argonauts.  He began the season as the Argos' starting left tackle, but after two games, was moved to the injured reserved list with an infected right index finger.  Pearson was treated to intravenous therapy with serious concerns over whether the infection required finger amputation.  He ultimately regained full health without any amputation and returned to his starting duties at left tackle on September 3, 2007 against the Winnipeg Blue Bombers.  On November 3, 2007, Pearson suffered a season-ending injury when teammate Chad Folk fell on his ankle.  On May 31, 2008, Pearson announced his retirement from professional football, after having played in nine regular season games for the Argonauts during 2007.

See also 

 2001 College Football All-America Team
 Florida Gators football, 1990–99
 History of the Jacksonville Jaguars
 List of Florida Gators football All-Americans
 List of Florida Gators in the NFL Draft
 List of University of Florida alumni
 List of University of Florida Athletic Hall of Fame members

References

Bibliography 

 Carlson, Norm, University of Florida Football Vault: The History of the Florida Gators, Whitman Publishing, LLC, Atlanta, Georgia (2007).  .
 Golenbock, Peter, Go Gators!  An Oral History of Florida's Pursuit of Gridiron Glory, Legends Publishing, LLC, St. Petersburg, Florida (2002).  .
 Hairston, Jack, Tales from the Gator Swamp: A Collection of the Greatest Gator Stories Ever Told, Sports Publishing, LLC, Champaign, Illinois (2002).  .
 McCarthy, Kevin M.,  Fightin' Gators: A History of University of Florida Football, Arcadia Publishing, Mount Pleasant, South Carolina (2000).  .

1980 births
Living people
All-American college football players
American football offensive tackles
American players of Canadian football
Canadian football offensive linemen
Florida Gators football players
Houston Texans players
Jacksonville Jaguars players
Miami Dolphins players
Players of American football from Tampa, Florida
Players of Canadian football from Tampa, Florida
Toronto Argonauts players